Patrick Blake Judd is a writer, producer, director who resides in Kentucky and works primarily out of Nashville, Tennessee.

Filmography

Television

Videography

Music videos

Electronic Press Kits (EPKs)

Exclusive Web Based Content

References 
BlakeJudd.com - BlakeJudd.com
Blake Judd on IMDB.com - IMDB
JD Wilkes.com - JDWilkes.com
Hank III - Hank3.com (October 30 post)
The Moonlight Cafe - Moonlight Cafe
Charlie Louvin:  Still Rattlin' The Devil's Cage Official - LouvinFilm.com

1981 births
Living people
People from Elizabethtown, Kentucky
Transylvania University alumni
People from Greensburg, Kentucky
Actors from Lexington, Kentucky
Male actors from Kentucky
Artists from Lexington, Kentucky
Film directors from Kentucky